
Year 396 (CCCXCVI) was a leap year starting on Tuesday (link will display the full calendar) of the Julian calendar. In the Roman Empire, it was known as the Year of the Consulship of Augustus and Augustus (or, less frequently, year 1149 Ab urbe condita). The denomination 396 for this year has been used since the early medieval period, when the Anno Domini calendar era became the prevalent method in Europe for naming years.

Events 
 By place 

 Roman Empire 
 Stilicho, Roman general (magister militum), controls the young emperor Honorius as his regent, and becomes the actual ruler of the Western Roman Empire. He enlists the Alemanni and the Franks, to defend the Rhine frontier.
 The Visigoths, led by Alaric I, rampage through Greece and plunder Corinth, Argos and Sparta. They destroy the Temple of Eleusis, and harry the Peloponnese. Stilicho makes peace with the Goths, and allows them to settle in Epirus (Balkans).

 China 
 Emperor Jìn Ān Dì, age 14, succeeds his father Emperor Xiaowu, as ruler of the Eastern Jin dynasty, after he is murdered by his concubine Honoured Lady Zhang.
 Lü Guang claims the title "Heavenly Prince" (Tian Wang), signifying his claim to the Later Liang Kingdom.

Births 
 Petronius Maximus, Western Roman Emperor (approximate date)

Deaths 
 Duan Yuanfei, empress and wife of emperor Murong Chui
 Dowager Helan, mother of emperor Wei Daowudi (b. 351)
 Jin Xiaowudi, emperor of the Eastern Jin Dynasty (b. 362)
 Murong Chui, general and founder of Later Yan (b. 326)

References